Pomacea aldersoni is a South American species of freshwater snail with gills and an operculum, an aquatic gastropod mollusc in the family Ampullariidae, the apple snails.

Etymology
P. aldersoni is named after the British conchologist and malacologist E. G. Alderson, who authored a revision of the genus Ampullaria in 1925.

Distribution
The native distribution of P. aldersoni is Ecuador. It was described from thirteen specimens which were collected in Santa Barbara, about 272 km SE. of Quito, in 1939.

References

aldersoni
Molluscs of South America
Invertebrates of Ecuador
Freshwater snails
Gastropods described in 1946